Sir Assad John Haloute is a co-founder and executive director of the Chefette fast food chain in Barbados. He was born in San Fernando, Trinidad and is of Syrian origin. He migrated to Barbados in 1971 and founded Chefette Restaurants one year later in 1972. The restaurant chain now boasts 15 outlets islandwide: 10 drive-thrus, 8 playgrounds, and 2 Barbecue Barns (fast casual dining).He is the creator of Wing Dings.

References

Barbadian cuisine
Year of birth missing (living people)
Living people
Trinidad and Tobago businesspeople
Barbadian businesspeople
Knights Bachelor
People from San Fernando, Trinidad and Tobago